HMS Bucephalus was a 32-gun frigate launched at Portsmouth on 3 November 1808. Bucephalus was present during the Invasion of Java. She was later reduced to 18-guns and converted into a troopship at Woolwich Dockyard in 1814. She was part of a squadron that carried the advance guard of Major General Keane's army, which was moving to attack New Orleans, part of the Gulf Campaign. Under the rules of prize-money, the troopship Bucephalus shared in the proceeds of the capture of the American vessels in the Battle of Lake Borgne on 14 December 1814.

Notes

Citations

References
 

Troop ships of the United Kingdom
1808 ships
Fifth-rate frigates of the Royal Navy
War of 1812 ships of the United Kingdom